SSBC may refer to:

 Sidney Sussex College Boat Club
 South Sudan Broadcasting Corporation